Mallotus ficifolius is a shrub of the spurge family Euphorbiaceae endemic to Northern and Central Queensland, Australia. The species is commonly called fig leafed mallotus

The species grows as an understorey and pioneer plant in wetter forest types including rainforest and vine scrub and gallery forest. Plants are typically 1–3 m in height and characterised by broad hairy leaves with serrated or toothed margins. Flowers are inconspicuous and yellow. Fruit are of the lobed type typical of the Euphorbiaceae, approximately 10mm in diameter and covered with rough, spiky projections.

References

ficifolia
Flora of Queensland
Malpighiales of Australia
Taxa named by Henri Ernest Baillon
Taxa named by Ferdinand Albin Pax
Taxa named by Käthe Hoffmann